Dager fra 1000 år is a 1970 Norwegian anthology film written and directed by Anja Breien, Egil Kolstø and Espen Thorstenson. These three young directors got a chance to each contribute to a segment of a featured film. The three episodes take place in the past, the present, and the future.

External links
 
 
 Dager fra 1000 år at the Norwegian Film Institute

1970 films
1970 drama films
Anthology films
Norwegian drama films